is a Japanese footballer who currently plays for ReinMeer Aomori.

Career
On 9 January 2019, Noda signed with ReinMeer Aomori FC.

Career statistics
Updated to 23 February 2020.

References

External links
Profile at Zweigen Kanazawa

Koji Noda – Urawa Red Diamonds official profile 
Koji Noda – Yahoo! Japan sports profile 

1986 births
Living people
Hannan University alumni
Association football people from Fukuoka Prefecture
Japanese footballers
J1 League players
J2 League players
Japan Football League players
Urawa Red Diamonds players
Fagiano Okayama players
V-Varen Nagasaki players
Ventforet Kofu players
Zweigen Kanazawa players
ReinMeer Aomori players
Association football defenders